Church Farm Feed is a minor,  long river—brook—and drainage ditch of the Pevensey Levels in Hailsham, Wealden District of East Sussex, England. Rising in Church Farm—from which it receives its name—the river flows an easterly course and gives rise to Church Farm Ditch. It also gives rise to and receives the waters of several unnamed streams.

References 

Rivers of East Sussex
Rivers of the Pevensey Levels